Coxton is an unincorporated community in Indian Creek Township, Lawrence County, Indiana.

History
Coxton had its start by the building of the railroad through that territory. A post office was established at Coxton in 1890, and remained in operation until it was discontinued in 1903.

Geography

References

Unincorporated communities in Lawrence County, Indiana
Unincorporated communities in Indiana